Ministry of Textiles and Jute (Pronounce: Bostro ō pāṭ Montronaloy) is Bangladesh's governmental parent agency for the country's Department of Textiles and Directorate General of Jute, together which are responsible for the promotion, development and regulation of its textile industry and jute sector.

Child agencies
Bangladesh Handloom Board
Bangladesh Jute Mills Corporation
Bangladesh Textile Mills Corporation
Bangladesh Sericulture Board
Bangladesh Sericulture Research and Training Institute
Jute Diversification Promotion Center
Bangladesh Jute Corporation

See also
Jute
Textiles

References 

 
Textiles and Jute
Jute
Textile industry of Bangladesh
Industry ministries
1978 establishments in Bangladesh